Luca Barla (born 29 September 1987) is an Italian road bicycle racer for Team Idea.

Palmares

2005
  U19 Road Race Champion

References

External links 

Italian male cyclists
1987 births
Living people
Sportspeople from the Province of Imperia
Cyclists from Liguria
People from Bordighera